Patricia Soman (born 12 August 1981) is a Côte d'Ivoire long jumper.

Achievements

Personal bests
Long jump - 6.38 m (2003)
Triple jump - 13.02 m (2003)

External links

1981 births
Living people
Ivorian female long jumpers